"Sparks" is the fifth single from the Norwegian duo Röyksopp. It is the last single from Röyksopp's debut album Melody A.M.. The vocals are provided by Norwegian singer Anneli Drecker.

Response
The single was released in 2003 in the UK and late 2003 worldwide. The single peaked at #41 on the UK Singles Chart.

Track listings
UK CD1
 "Sparks" (Edit) – 3:06
 "Don't Go" – 7:20
 "So Easy" (Derrick Carter Remix)

UK CD2
 "Sparks" (Roni Size Edit) – 3:26
 "Sparks" (Mandy Remix) – 8:55
 "Sparks" (Murk Downtown Miami Mix) – 8:23 
 "Remind Me" (Someone Else's Mix) – 3:45
 "Remind Me" (Video) – 4:05

Versions
There are several versions of "Sparks" that were released.
 Sparks (Radio Mix)
 Sparks (Roni Size Edit)
 Sparks (Murk Downtown Miami Mix)
 Sparks (Roni Size Mix)
 Sparks (Roni Size Instrumental)
 Sparks (Losoul Remix)

The track "Don't Go" features on some versions of this single.

Chart positions

Use of the song in popular culture
"Sparks" was featured in the TV series Six Feet Under, season 2 episode 6 (about 51 minutes into the episode). It is played in a scene with Nate entering Brenda’s apartment, finding her hard at work on her computer writing her novel. The two of them talk about people choosing to stay together through bad relationships.

References 

2003 singles
Röyksopp songs
2001 songs
Songs written by Svein Berge
Astralwerks singles
Songs written by Torbjørn Brundtland